Publicly owned can refer to:

Public utility, a publicly-owned utility that provides infrastructure and sometimes services
Public company, a company which is permitted to offer its securities for sale to the general public
State ownership, also known as public ownership, of government-owned corporations